In 1816, the Democratic-Republican candidates ran unopposed.

New Jersey elected its members November 4–5, 1816.

See also 
 1816 and 1817 United States House of Representatives elections
 List of United States representatives from New Jersey

1816
New Jersey
United States House of Representatives